Tandoor bread refers to a bread baked in a clay oven called a tandoor.

History 
Cooking food in a tandoor oven has been done for about five millennia. Remains of a clay oven with indication of cooked food have been excavated in the Indus River valley site of Kalibangan, and other places in present-day Afghanistan, Pakistan, northwest India, Iran, Iraq and Central Asia.

The English word tandoor comes from Hindi/Urdu  ( / ), which derives from Persian tanūr or tandūr. According to the Dehkhoda Persian Dictionary, the Persian word ultimately came from the Akkadian word , which consists of the parts  'mud' and  'fire' and is mentioned as early as in the Akkadian Epic of Gilgamesh.

Tandoor ovens are not prevalent in the average Indian home because they are expensive to fabricate, install and maintain. Authentic tandoori cuisine in urban areas can often be found in specialty restaurants. However, in rural areas in India such as Punjab, the tandoor oven is considered a social institution, for a tandoor oven is shared among the community. Women would go to the oven place with atta along with their marinated meats to meet their neighbors and friends, so they could converse and share stories while waiting for their food to cook. The people in cities once engaged in this social activity, but as businesses and commercialism grew in these areas, communal tandoor ovens have become rare. Not uncommonly, people bring food to their local bakeries to cook it there at a fair price.

Because of the growing inaccessibility of a tandoor oven in urban areas, especially in cities outside of Southern Asia, people have developed ingenious techniques to replicate the cooking process and the food without the use of the oven. Common alternatives include an oven or a grill fueled by charcoal or wood so the food will be infused with the smoky flavor.

Varieties

West Asia 

In some places where it is especially common, such as Iraq, it may be called simply  (bread). It is similar to, or in some cases the same as, taboon bread.

Varieties include nân-e barbari, tâftun, and shirmal.

Lavash is an unleavened variety of tandoor bread eaten in this region.

Central Asia 
In Central Asia, tandyr nan (Kazakh/Kyrgyz:  , Uzbek: ,) is made and eaten.

South Asia

India 
Tandoor breads are popular in northwestern Indian regions, especially in Himachal Pradesh, Gujarat, Jammu and Kashmir, Uttar Pradesh, Bihar, Madhya Pradesh, Uttarakhand, Rajasthan, Haryana and Punjab regions, where naan breads and atta flat breads such as the Tandoori roti are baked in tandoor clay ovens fired by wood or charcoal. These naans are known as tandoori naan.
Tandoor ovens are not prevalent in the average Indian home because they are expensive to fabricate, install and maintain. Authentic tandoori cuisine in urban areas can often be found in specialty restaurants and dhabas, which are street-side reasonably fared restaurants that usually line Indian highways. However, in rural areas in India such as Punjab, the tandoor oven is considered a social institution, for a tandoor oven is shared among the community. Women would go to the oven place with atta along with their marinated meats to meet their neighbors and friends so they could converse and share stories while waiting for their food to cook. The people in cities once engaged in this social activity, but as businesses and commercialism grew in these areas, communal tandoor ovens have become rare. Not uncommonly, people bring food to their local bakeries to cook it there at a fair price.

Pakistan 
In Pakistan, tandoor breads are a staple across the country. In rural areas, each home often has its own tandoor, while in urban areas commercial tandoors are available where people buy bread for breakfast, lunch, and dinner. These commercial tandoors are especially popular during summer times when high temperatures in parts of the country make cooking bread at home an unpleasant chore. 

These breads range from a simple Tandoori roti which is unleavened bread, to yeast-based khamiri roti, as well as richer and more complex (yeast, milk, egg, etc.-based) naans and kulcha breads. In Pakistani cuisine, specific types of tandoori breads are often eaten with specific foods. Some of the most popular tandoori breads include Sheermal, Taftan, and Roghni naan.

Commonly, central tandoor was often a social institution where people would bring their atta or dough to be cooked; and bartered with the baker using  or wheat.  

Because of the growing inaccessibility of a tandoor oven in urban areas, especially in cities outside of Southern Asia, people have developed ingenious techniques to replicate the cooking process and the food without the use of the oven. Common alternatives include an oven or a grill fueled by charcoal or wood so the food will be infused with the smoky flavor.

Tandoori roti is commonly consumed in South Asian countries such as Pakistan and India. This bread is served in restaurants, hotels, industrial canteens and at home. It is also gaining popularity in Asia, North America (outside of the Caribbean) and Europe due to migrants during British colonialism.

Caribbean 
Tandoor bread is found in Caribbean countries such as Guyana, Suriname and Trinidad and Tobago (as roti).

Physical and chemical composition 
Aroma, smell, appearance, color, size and overall texture are the general characteristics that are optimized by producers of tandoor bread. The texture and quality of tandoor bread are determined by the percentage of wheat protein, the number of essential amino acids and type of flour present in the bread. Various studies have demonstrated that the chemical and biochemical composition of flours affects the flour's ability to interact with the other ingredients in tandoor bread.

Response surface methodology is a process which allows for development of palatable tandoor breads that have a long shelf life and contain minimal amounts of polycyclic aromatic hydrocarbons, which may pose health hazards. For optimal sensory and chemical stability of tandoor bread, the water level is 720 milliliters per kilogram, protein concentrations range from 10.3% to 11.5%, between 1.2 and 1.6% salt is added, and the bread is baked in temperatures ranging from 330 to 450 °C.

See also
 Primitive clay oven
 Wood-fired oven

Gallery

References 

Breads
Middle Eastern cuisine
Iraqi cuisine
Levantine cuisine
Indo-Caribbean cuisine
Central Asian cuisine
South Asian cuisine
Fijian cuisine